Philip John Diamond  is a Professor in the School of Physics and Astronomy at the University of Manchester. He was the director of the Jodrell Bank Centre for Astrophysics from 1 October 2006 until 2010. He was the Chief of CSIRO's Astronomy and Space Sciences Division from 1 June 2010 and in October 2012 he left CSIRO to become the Director General of the Square Kilometre Array (SKA) Organisation.

Education
Diamond was educated at the University of Leeds ( Bachelor of Science 1979) and the University of Manchester where he was awarded a PhD in Radio astronomy in 1982 for work on MERLIN and OH/IR stars.

Research

Diamond's research focuses on astrophysical masers.

References

Living people
1958 births